Ivanka pri Nitre is a village and municipality in the Nitra District in western central Slovakia, in the Nitra Region.

History
In historical records the village was first mentioned in 1400.  The Byzantine Monomachus crown was unearthed there in 1860 by a farmer ploughing in what was then Nyitraivánka in the Kingdom of Hungary.

Geography
The village lies at an altitude of 146 metres and covers an area of 14.909 km². It has a population of about 2415 people.

Ethnicity
The village is approximately 98% Slovak.

Facilities
The village has a public library a gym and football pitch.

See also
 List of municipalities and towns in Slovakia

References

Genealogical resources

The records for genealogical research are available at the state archive "Statny Archiv in Nitra, Slovakia"

 Roman Catholic church records (births/marriages/deaths): 1704-1914 (parish A)
 Lutheran church records (births/marriages/deaths): 1887-1954 (parish B)

External links
 https://web.archive.org/web/20071027094149/http://www.statistics.sk/mosmis/eng/run.html
 http://www.ivankaprinitre.sk
Surnames of living people in Ivanka pri Nitre

Villages and municipalities in Nitra District